In American football, the dime defense is a defensive alignment that uses six defensive backs. It is usually employed in obvious passing situations. The formation usually consists of six defensive backs, usually two safeties, and four cornerbacks, and has either four down linemen and one linebacker, or three down linemen and two linebackers. This formation is used to prevent the offense from completing a medium- to long-range pass play. This may be because the offense's running game is inefficient, time is an issue, or they need a long pass for a first down. It is also used against teams whose pass-to-run ratio predominantly favors pass. The formation, however, is vulnerable to running plays as the formation is missing two linebackers, or a linebacker and a down lineman.

A dime defense differs from the nickel defense – from which it derives its name – in that it adds a sixth defensive back to the secondary. This sixth defensive back is called a "dimeback" (D). The defense gets its name because a dime, worth ten cents, is the next step up in United States coin currency from a nickel, which is worth 5 cents. 

There are also "quarter" and "half-dollar" formations, each protecting against progressively deeper and more likely pass attempts. In 2010, the New York Giants consistently added an extra safety instead of an extra cornerback, resulting in three safeties and three cornerbacks. This has been called a "giant dime".

References

American football strategy
American football formations